Stoke-on-Trent City Council is the local authority of Stoke-on-Trent, Staffordshire, England. As a unitary authority, it has the combined powers of a non-metropolitan county and district council and is administratively separate from the rest of Staffordshire.

Since the 2019 election the council has been run by a Conservative minority administration with support from independent councillors.

Powers and functions
The local authority derives its powers and functions from the Local Government Act 1972 and subsequent legislation. For the purposes of local government, Stoke-on-Trent is a non-metropolitan area of England. As a unitary authority, Stoke-on-Trent City Council has the powers and functions of both a non-metropolitan county and district council combined. In its capacity as a district council it is a billing authority collecting Council Tax and business rates, it processes local planning applications, it is responsible for housing, waste collection and environmental health. In its capacity as a county council it is a local education authority, responsible for social services, libraries and waste disposal.

History 
A Stoke-on-Trent Borough Council was established in 1874 when the town was made a municipal borough. On the federation of Stoke-on-Trent in 1910, it merged with five neighbouring towns and became a county borough. The borough was awarded city status on 5 June 1925, and the council has therefore been a city council since then.

In 2002 the council adopted a new form of executive arrangements, having a directly-elected mayor and a council manager, one of three possible options outlined in the Local Government Act 2000. Stoke was the only council in the country to adopt this option. A 2008 report by the Stoke-on-Trent Governance Commission to the Secretary of State for Local Government was highly critical of the political system then in use in the city. This led to changes to the electoral map in May 2011:  From a council of 60 members representing 20 wards with three councillors each, the size of the council was reduced to 44 councillors representing 37 wards (31 single member wards, five two-member wards and one three-member ward).

Political control

The council comprises 44 councillors elected from 29 wards. Since the 2015 election the council has been under no overall control, with a coalition of independent councillors and Conservatives taking the leading positions on the council. The leader of the council since 2019 has been Abi Brown, a Conservative. Following the May 2019 local elections, Stoke-on-Trent City Council comprised 15 Labour councillors, 15 Conservative councillors, 11 "City Independent" councillors, two independent councillors and one non-aligned independent councillor. It is led by a minority Conservative administration. The next election is due in 2023.

In the media 
On 4 May 2020, Mohammed Pervez, then leader of the Labour opposition and councillor for Moorcroft ward, announced his resignation after 14 years, citing "work-life balance" and a decision to "focus more on my daytime job and family". The following day, local newspaper Stoke Sentinel quoted a Staffordshire Police spokesperson saying they were investigating Mr. Pervez following a complaint about an unspecified "alleged criminal offence". However, in late 2021, the police stated that after an investigation, a decision had been made not to bring charges against Mr. Pervez.

Deputy leader of the Labour opposition, Paul Shotton, took over Mr. Pervez's former opposition leadership role on an interim basis. Since the Autumn of 2020, Jane Ashworth (Labour, Burslem Central) has served as leader of the opposition and leader of the Stoke-on-Trent Labour group. The Moorcroft by-election, which took place on 6 May 2021, resulted in Conservative Tariq Mahmood’s election to fill the vacancy. The police are currently investigating this election due to allegations of voter fraud.

In 2014, Shotton, then deputy council leader, was reported to have "frequently" used false names to contact BBC Radio Stoke to praise the council's and his own work.  This resulted in his suspension by the Labour party and the "loss of senior council roles". In 2014, Private Eye magazine awarded Shotton the "Rotten Boroughs award" for media manipulation.

References

Local authorities in Staffordshire
Unitary authority councils of England
Local education authorities in England
Leader and cabinet executives
Billing authorities in England
1974 establishments in England
City Council